İbrahimli  is a small village in Mut district of  Mersin Province, Turkey. The village is situated in the Toros Mountains. The population of İbrahimli was 97 as of 2012. The main economic activity is agriculture and animal husbandry.

References

Villages in Mut District